Kamloops Excel is a Canadian soccer team based in Kamloops, British Columbia, Canada. Founded in 2007, the team plays in Pacific Coast Soccer League (PCSL), a national amateur league at the fourth tier of the American Soccer Pyramid, which features teams from western Canada and the Pacific Northwest region of the United States of America. They now play in the reserve division.

The team plays its home matches in at Hillside Stadium on the campus of Thompson Rivers University, where they have played since 2007. The team's colours are maroon, white and black.

Players

Current roster

Year-by-year

Head coaches
  Franco Spada (2007–present)

Stadiums
 Hillside Stadium; Kamloops, British Columbia (2007–present)

External links
 Kamloops Excel

Soccer clubs in British Columbia
Sport in Kamloops
Pacific Coast Soccer League teams
Association football clubs established in 2007
2007 establishments in British Columbia